Radhanagar is  a  village in the Ghatal CD block in the Ghatal subdivision of the Paschim Medinipur district in the state of West Bengal, India.

Geography

Location

Area overview
Ishwar Chandra Vidyasagar, scholar, social reformer and a key figure of the Bengal Renaissance, was born at Birsingha on 26 September 1820.

Ghatal subdivision, shown in the map alongside, has alluvial soils. Around 85% of the total cultivated area is cropped more than once. It has a density of population of 1,099 per km2, but being a small subdivision only a little over a fifth of the people in the district reside in this subdivision. 14.33% of the population lives in urban areas and 86.67% lives in the rural areas.

Note: The map alongside presents some of the notable locations in the subdivision. All places marked in the map are linked in the larger full screen map.

Demographics
According to the 2011 Census of India, Radhanagar had a total population of 5,827, of which 2,989 (51%) were males and 2,838 (49%) were females. There were 658 persons in the age range of 0–6 years. The total number of literate persons in Radhanagar was 4,185 (80.96% of the population over 6 years).

Education
Radhanagar Dinamayee Vidyamandirl is a Bengali-medium coeducational institution established in 1972. The school has facilities for teaching from class V to class X. It has a library with 300 books.

Culture
David J. McCutchion mentions the Raghunatha temple as a pancha-ratna with ridged rekha turrets and porch on triple archway. Built of laterite, plain, in 1718, it measures 23’ 6” square.

Raghunath  temple at Radhanagar is a state protected monument.

Radhanagar picture gallery

References

External links

Villages in Paschim Medinipur district